Bestha (OBC) is a major caste in Karnataka, Telangana and Andhra Pradesh in southern India. The major occupation of this community is fishing and boating.

History
The Besthas are summed up, in the Madras Census Report, 1891, as "a  kannada caste, the hereditary occupation of which is hunting and fishing, but they have largely taken to agriculture, and the professions of bearers and cooks." Later in the Census Report, 1901, it is stated that "the fisherman caste in the Deccan districts are called Besthas and Kabbēras, while those in some parts of the Coimbatore and Salem districts style themselves Toreyar, Siviyar, and Parivārattar. There are two endogamous sub-divisions in the Bestha caste, namely the Telaga and the Parigirti. Some say that the Kabbili or Kabbēravāndlu are a third. The Parigirti section trace their descent from Sūtudu, the famous expounder of the Māhābhārata. Besthas employ Brāhmans and Sātānis (or Jangams, if Saivites) for their domestic ceremonies, and imitate the Brāhman customs, prohibiting widow remarriage." It is suggested, in the Gazetteer of the Bellary district, that the Besthas are really a sub-division of the Gangimakkalu Kabbēras, who were originally palanquin-bearers, but, now that these vehicles have gone out of fashion, are employed in divers other ways. It may be noted that the Siviyars of Coimbatore say that they are Besthas who emigrated from Mysore in the troubled times of the Muhammadan usurpation. The name Siviyar, they say, was given to them by the Tamils, as, being strong and poor, they were palanquin-bearers to officers on circuit and others in the pre-railway days. Their main occupations at the present day are tank and river fishing.

In Karnataka
It is considered as one of the largest community in Karnataka with  population equivalent to idigas population. Koli, kabbaliga, Ambiga, Mogaveera, bestha,Jamadar, kharvi( harikantha ), gangamatha, Madder, barikera are the different names called for this community in different parts of karnataka. Mogaveeras are major fishing peoples with significant population in coastal Karnataka Especially in Udupi and Dakshina Kannada district, kolis and kabbaligas are major fishing peoples in Gulburga, Yadgir and bidar districts with a highest population more than 5 lakhs.

In Telangana
The bestha population is significant and fish farming in tanks and lakes is their main livelihood.

In Andhra Pradesh 
The Bestha population is very large in Andhra Pradesh. There are above 60 lakhs traditional fishermen in Andhra Pradesh with different caste names such as jalari, Goondla, Gangaputra, Bestha,Vada Balija, Kandra, Neyallu and Pattapu in coastal Andhra region &Telangana region.They have demanded that the fishermen community be included in the ST list.

Based on the profession some castes are misunderstood. For example, Rajus of Godavari region as well as agnikula kshatriyas. Both the communities are very active in aqua culture and sea fishing business as fishing is a big business; however, they are not Besthas.

A delegation of fishermen of Andhra Pradesh met the Indian prime minister in March 1999 and urged him for introducing a bill regarding inclusion of fishermen community in the ST list. But, there is hardly any progress made in this regard.

Like other Telugu castes, the Besthas have surnames or exogamous septs and gōtras. In connection with some of the latter, certain prohibitions are observed. For example, the jasmine plant (mallē) may not be touched by members of the mallē gōtra, and the ippa tree (Bassia latifolia) may not be touched or used by members of the Ippala gōtra. In some regions their proper occupations, beside that of carrying the palanquin, are fishing and river boating.

References 

Social groups of Karnataka
Social groups of Telangana